The Raintree Hotel Anna Salai is a five-star hotel located on Anna Salai in Chennai, India. It is the second hotel of The Raintree hotels opened in July 2010 at a cost of  2,000 million.

History
The hotel was opened in July 2010. In August 2013, the hotel joined Summit Hotels & Resorts, a brand of the Preferred Hotel Group, which included the hotel in its Asia Pacific portfolio.

The hotel
The hotel has a total of 230 rooms. The rooms are divided into 154 deluxe rooms, 8 premium rooms, 51club rooms, 4 studio rooms, 12 executive suites and 1 presidential suite. The restaurants at the hotel include Kitchen, a multi-cuisine restaurant, Madras, a South Indian delicacies restaurant, Madera, a lounge bar, Up North, the roof-top Punjabi restaurant and High Bar. The hotel also has a roof-top pool along with a health club and spa.

The hotel was designed by Uphasani Design Cells architects and the interiors were done by Zeiler & Lim, Malaysia.

Awards
Times Food Award for Best Seafood Cuisine; Presented by Times of India – 2012
NDTV Hindu Lifestyle Award for Best Eco Hotel; Presented by NDTV Hindu – 2011
Business Gaurav SME Award 2011- Hospitality; Presented by D & B – Axis Bank – 2011

See also

 Hotels in Chennai
 Raintree Hotel St Mary's Road
 List of tallest buildings in Chennai

References

External links
Homepage of the Raintree Hotels

Hotels in Chennai
Hotels established in 2010
Skyscraper hotels in Chennai
2010 establishments in Tamil Nadu